Glenavon School is located in Auckland, New Zealand. Glenavon school offers education from pre-school (kindergarten) through to Year 8. A special school is also on the campus.

History 
Glenavon School opened in 1955 after considerable effort was made in clearing the swampy land for construction of the facilities. The school is the first school in New Zealand to be built entirely on fill.

Sports 
There are four sports houses used in competitions such as Athletics Day and Cross country. They are:

 Wai (blue)
 Hau (gold)
 Ahi (red)
 Whenua (green)

There are a variety of sports available for the children to join. There are mixed teams in rugby and cricket. Annual events such as Cross country and Athletics are participated in by the students.

Academic 
Glenavon School follows the New Zealand Curriculum as set out by the Ministry of Education (New Zealand). However, the exception is Religious Education. Students in Years 4 to 8 have the option to attend religious studies.

Other facilities on the site 
As well as the Primary and Intermediate School on the campus, Glenavon School also has an Early Childhood centre for pre-school aged children and also a Special School called Oaklynn. Although these two facilities are on the campus they operate autonomously to that of the school.

Future school design 
The school has made an information centre to be used as a multi-purpose room for various subjects, from cooking to scientific experiments.</ref>

Notes 

Primary schools in Auckland
Intermediate schools in New Zealand
Educational institutions established in 1955
1955 establishments in New Zealand
Schools in West Auckland, New Zealand